Two ships of the Royal Navy have borne the name HMS Mona's Isle; they are named for the Isle of Man.

 , a Manx paddle steamer purchased by the Royal Navy in the First World War
 , a Manx packet requisitioned by the Royal Navy in the Second World War

Sources

Royal Navy ship names